ENOi was a seven member South Korean boy band formed by KiTheWhale in 2019. The group debuted on April 19, 2019, with "Bloom". They disbanded on January 22, 2021.

Former members
Laon (라온) - leader, vocalist
Dojin (도진) - rapper
Hamin (하민) - vocalist
Avin (어빈) - vocalist
Jinwoo (진우) - vocalist
J-kid (제이키드) - vocalist
Gun (건) - rapper

Discography

Special albums

Extended plays

References

K-pop music groups
South Korean boy bands
South Korean dance music groups
Musical groups from Seoul
Musical groups established in 2019
2019 establishments in South Korea
South Korean pop music groups
Musical groups disestablished in 2021
2021 disestablishments in South Korea